Robin Pappas is an American actress. She graduated from the Royal Academy of Acting. Her credits include The Shining and Superman II, as well as an uncredited role in Chariots of Fire.  She is the mother of singer-songwriter Nellie McKay. She also served as the executive producer of her daughter's second album, Pretty Little Head and co-produced fifth album Home Sweet Mobile Home with McKay herself. She appeared in the music video for "David".

Partial filmography
The Shining (1980) - Nurse
Superman II (1980) - Alice
Chariots of Fire (1981) - Clare (uncredited) (final film role)

External links

Robin is the daughter of Mary Pappas.  Mary was English and moved to the US when she was young.  Robin married Malcolm Mckay.  Their daughter is Nellie Mckay,

Living people
American film actresses
Year of birth missing (living people)
20th-century American actresses
Alumni of RADA
21st-century American women